Alan Koger (born September 25, 1987) is an American soccer player.

Career

College and amateur
Koger attended Magna Vista High School, where he played both soccer and was his school's American football placekicker, and played club soccer for Greensboro Soccer Club 87 Green, before going on to play college soccer at the College of William & Mary, where he was given the nickname "Cabbage."

After redshirting his freshman season, Koger was named to the CAA All-Rookie Team in 2007, was named to the All-CAA Second-Team as a junior in 2009, and was an All-CAA First-Team honoree, was named to the All-South Atlantic Region Second-Team, and the VaSID All-State First-Team after appearing in 22 games and scoring 10 goals as a senior in 2010.

During his college years Koger also played with Virginia Legacy in the USL Premier Development League.

Professional
Koger was drafted in the third round (54th overall) of the 2011 MLS SuperDraft by New England Revolution. He made his professional debut and scored his first professional goal on April 26, 2011, in the Revs' 3–2 victory over D.C. United in the Lamar Hunt US Open Cup.

Koger was waived by New England on November 23, 2011.

References

External links
 
 William & Mary profile

1987 births
Living people
American soccer players
William & Mary Tribe men's soccer players
Legacy 76 players
New England Revolution players
USL League Two players
People from Henry County, Virginia
Soccer players from Virginia
New England Revolution draft picks
Association football forwards